Gemini Home Entertainment is a horror anthology web series created by Remy Abode and periodically released on a YouTube channel of the same name. The series takes place in the 1980s and 90s and is presented as a collection of clips from VHS tapes produced by various fictional companies and distributed by the eponymous company Gemini Home Entertainment. Though superficially self-contained and exploring a variety of topics, such as wildlife, technology and astronomy, the clips also tell an overarching story of extraterrestrial invasion and the impending end of the world.

Gemini Home Entertainment is regarded as an iconic analog horror series and combines elements of cosmic horror, surrealism, body horror and Native American mythology. The main series, also known as the Full Boxset, is ongoing as of date. Further videos have also been released since as part of the spin-off series Library.

Premise 
The overall story of Gemini Home Entertainment is set in the 1980s and 1990s and is told through a series of clips presented as VHS tapes distributed by the fictional company Gemini Home Entertainment. The tapes are a mixture of educational clips, commercials, public service announcements and home videos, produced by various fictional companies such as Regnad Computing, Harbinge Technologies and Optica! Video. The motivations, morals and content varies between the companies. The videos are complete with lo-fi music reminiscent of similar real-life videos.

The different episodes are superficially self-contained, exploring topics such as wildlife, artificial intelligence and the Solar System, but together they build a cohesive narrative and serve to document the impending end of the world. The storyline of Gemini Home Entertainment features extraterrestrial invasion and parasitism and combines elements of cosmic horror, body horror and Native American mythology. The series includes threats such as extraterrestrial creatures ("Woodcrawlers") using humans as "vessels", a fictional infectious disease called "Deep Root Disease", and a fictional plant or fungus called "Nature's Mockery" that mutilates people it comes into contact with. Videos typically begin in a mundane way before incorporating horror elements. The series's central antagonist is The Iris, a sentient planet or planet-like entity which is masterminding an invasion of the Solar System and is influencing life on Earth.

Episodes 
The main series of Gemini Home Entertainment began in 2019 and appears to be ongoing. The episodes were later organized into a playlist on the official YouTube channel under the title Gemini Home Entertainment Full Boxset. A spin-off series, Library, premiered on the same YouTube channel in 2021. Library contains shorter and "secret" episodes that do not follow the format of the main episodes and focus on exploring some of the more misunderstood and confusing concepts introduced in the main series.

Full Boxset (2019–2021) 
In addition to the sixteen released episodes, Abode has also released two cancelled episodes through their Patreon, "Your Best Self" (July 22, 2021) and "Basics of Broadcast" (May 17, 2022), though neither episode is considered to be canonical to the series.

Library (2021–present)

Development 
Gemini Home Entertainment was created by an anonymous YouTube creator under the alias Remy Abode. Abode was driven to create analog horror since the genre was very easy to get into; it was possible to create entire short films without having to actually record footage or take photographs of their own and cheaply made visual effects could be disguised under a layer of static interference. The storyline of the series was mainly inspired by creepypastas (horror legends) on the Internet revolving around mythological creatures such as wendigos and skin-walkers. Further inspiration came in the form of classic science fiction horror films such as Alien (1979) and The Thing (1982). One of the subplots of Gemini Home Entertainment revolves around a campsite called Moonlight Acres; this portion was inspired by the more recent horror films The Endless (2017) and The Ritual (2017). Abode made the decision to largely exclude jump scares from Gemini Home Entertainment due to finding horror more effective when it did not "provide the climactic release that a jumpscare brings" and instead simply maintained prolonged tension.

The series heavily makes use of stock footage, downloaded from free websites such as Pexels, for some of its location shots but also, especially in later installments, incorporates footage shot by Abode using their own camera. Abode used Hitfilm Express, a free video-editing software, to create the VHS effects of Gemini Home Entertainment, FL Studio for some of the musical cues and for the general sound design, and Sketchbook for designing and drawing the different creatures. Some of the videos contain 3D models created by Abode's friend Swift Animations. Abode has described creating the effects as a "wildly messy and complicated" process. Almost all of the music used in Gemini Home Entertainment is sourced from old music albums from the 1980s and 90s, typically sourced from YouTube playlists.

Reception 
Gemini Home Entertainment is regarded as one of the most iconic analog horror series and is typically regarded as one of the premiere examples of the genre, alongside Local 58. Bailee Perkins of Hyperreal Film Club wrote in a 2022 review that Gemini Home Entertainment was her "favorite analog horror series to date" and that it was planned out and executed in a great way. Nestor Kok of F Newsmagazine also praised the series in 2022, calling it "as novel as it is ambitious" and praising its horror relying on growing anxiety, unease and a slow realization of the impending end of the world, rather than gore and jump scares.

Tanner Fox of Screen Rant referred to Gemini Home Entertainment in 2021 as "nearly as notorious as Local 58" and found the series to be "eerily authentic" and "an absolute much-watch for those who enjoy this sort of lo-fi horror". Lacey Womack, also of Screen Rant, assessed Gemini Home Entertainment in 2022 as "excruciatingly strange", "tough to follow" and one of the best video-based alternate reality games. Gemini Home Entertainment was also positively reviewed by Alicia Szczesniak of The Post, who noted that "the horror of this series comes from the helplessness experienced by the victims of the beings in this series", no one being safe in the situations depicted.

Notes

References

External links 
 Official Gemini Home Entertainment YouTube channel
 Remy Abode's personal YouTube channel
 Lethal Omen game at Itch.io
 

2019 web series debuts
2010s YouTube series
American web series
Horror fiction web series
Fictional companies